Classic 263, formerly Radio 1, and later Spot FM / SFM, is a Zimbabwean talk radio station that is owned by the country's national broadcaster. It broadcasts mainly in English. Other languages include Ndebele and Shona.

History 
It was originally launched to cater to the white community in urban and farming areas.

The station is situated in Zimbabwe's capital, Harare. It was previously based in Bulawayo. The station changed its name from Radio 1 to Spot FM or SFM in 2001.

It broadcasts mainly talk shows that include politics, current affairs, and sports. Musically, the station plays a variety of genres, favoring the mature audience of urban Zimbabwe.

The station's current slogan is "Now we are talking".

References

External links

Radio stations in Zimbabwe